Religion within the Bounds of Bare Reason is a 1793 book by the German philosopher Immanuel Kant. Although its purpose and original intent has become a matter of some dispute, the book's immense and lasting influence on the history of theology and the philosophy of religion is indisputable. It consists of four parts, called "Pieces" (Stücke), originally written as a series of four journal articles. He strongly criticises ritual, superstition and a church hierarchy in this work.

Royal censorship

The First Piece originally appeared as a Berlinische Monatsschrift article (April 1792). Kant's attempt to publish the Second Piece in the same journal met with opposition from the king's censor. Kant then arranged to have all four pieces published as a book, routing it through the philosophy department at University of Jena to avoid the need for theological censorship. Kant was reprimanded for this action of insubordination. When he nevertheless published a second edition in 1794, the censor was so irate that he arranged for a royal order that required Kant never to publish or even speak publicly about religion.

Title meaning and translations

The book's title is based on a metaphor Kant introduces in the Prefaces and uses throughout the book, whereby rational religion is depicted as a naked ("bare") body while historical religions are regarded as "clothing" that are not appropriate "vehicles" for conveying religious truths to the populace. The earliest translation treats this metaphor literally: using "naked" ignores the fact that Kant's "bloßen" can also mean "mere". The most recent translation solves this problem by using the English "bare", which also has both meanings.

English translations 
 Religion Within the Boundary of Pure Reason Semple translation 1838
 Stephen R. Palmquist, Comprehensive Commentary on Kant's Religion Within the Bounds of Bare Reason. John Wiley & Sons, 2016. A revision of Pluhar's translation, with a detailed commentary on the text, including on Kant's own changes between his first and second editions of Religion. 
 Werner S. Pluhar, Religion within the Bounds of Bare Reason. Indianapolis: Hackett Publishing Company, 2009. Description & arrow-searchable table of Contents.  With an Introduction by Stephen Palmquist. 
 Allen W. Wood and George di Giovanni, Religion within the Boundaries of Mere Reason. Cambridge: Cambridge University Press, 1998. With an Introduction by Robert Merrihew Adams. Also included in Immanuel Kant: Religion and Rational Theology, volume 6 of The Cambridge Edition of the Works of Immanuel Kant, pp.55-215.
 Theodore M. Greene and Hoyt H. Hudson, Religion within the Limits of Reason Alone. New York: Harper and Brothers, 1934/1960.
 T.K. Abbott, translation of the First Piece only, on pp.323-360 of Immanuel Kant's Critique of Practical Reason and Other Works in Theory of Ethics. London: Longmans, Green & Co., Ltd, 1873.
 J.W. Semple, (title unknown). Edinburgh: Thomas Clark, 1838/1848.
 John Richardson, Religion within the Boundaries of Naked Reason extracts in J.S. Beck's The Principles of Critical Philosophy (1798). Revised and reprinted in Richardson's Essays and Treatises (London: William Richardson, 1799), volume 2, pp.367-422.
 Jonathan Bennett, "Religion within the Limits of Bare Reason", Early Modern Texts, 2017.

See also
 Radical evil

References

Further reading
 Chris L. Firestone,  Stephen R. Palmquist (eds.), Kant and the New Philosophy of Religion, Indiana University Press, 2006.

1793 books
Books by Immanuel Kant
German non-fiction books
Philosophy books
Philosophy of religion literature